The 1934–35 Plunket Shield season was the fourteenth season where the Plunket Shield, the domestic first-class cricket competition of New Zealand, was competed as a league. Canterbury won the championship.

Table

Results

Round 1

Round 2

Round 3

Statistics

Most runs
Paul Whitelaw of Auckland was the highest scorer with 384 runs at an average of 76.80. He was the only player to score two centuries.

Most wickets
Les Townsend, playing for Auckland, was the leading wicket-taker with 24 at an average of 13.91.

References

Plunket Shield
Plunket Shield